The Reunion is a 1976 album by jazz pianist George Shearing and violinist Stéphane Grappelli.

Reception

Ron Wynn reviewed the album for Allmusic and wrote that "Shearing's sessions are usually more introspective and light than upbeat and hot, but Grappelli's soaring, exuberant violin solos seem to put a charge into Shearing, who responds with some of his hottest playing in many years".

Track listing 
 "I'm Coming Virginia" (Donald Heywood, Will Marion Cook) – 3:00
 "Time After Time" (Jule Styne, Sammy Cahn) – 4:43
 "La Chanson de Rue" (Stéphane Grappelli) – 3:55
 "Too Marvelous for Words" (Richard A. Whiting, Johnny Mercer) – 4:04
 "It Don't Mean a Thing (If It Ain't Got That Swing)" (Duke Ellington, Irving Mills) – 4:06
 "Makin' Whoopee" (Gus Kahn, Walter Donaldson) – 5:03
 "After You've Gone" (Henry Creamer, Turner Layton) – 4:18
 "Flamingo" (Edmund Anderson, Ted Grouya) – 4:21
 "Star Eyes" (Don Raye, Gene de Paul) – 3:10
 "The Folks Who Live On the Hill" (Jerome Kern, Oscar Hammerstein II) – 5:34

Personnel 
George Shearing – piano, liner notes
Stéphane Grappelli – violin
Andy Simpkins – double bass
Rusty Jones – drums
Production
Martin Kunzler – liner notes
David Redfern, U. Erdt – photography
Franz Froeb – cover design
Willi Fruth – recording director
Hans Georg Brunner-Schwer – producer, engineer

References

1976 albums
MPS Records albums
Stéphane Grappelli albums
George Shearing albums